Dolichodorus heterocephalus is a plant pathogenic nematode.

References

External links 
Nemaplex, University of California - Dolichodorus heterocephalus

Tylenchida
Agricultural pest nematodes
Nematodes described in 1914